Thomas Vincent (born 1964) is a French film director, screenwriter and actor. His 1999 film Karnaval was entered into the 49th Berlin International Film Festival where it won the Alfred Bauer Prize.

Selected filmography
 Karnaval (1999)
 The Hook (2004)
 Mister Bob (2011)
 The New Life of Paul Sneijder (La nouvelle vie de Paul Sneijder) (2016)
 Role Play (TBA)

References

External links
 

1964 births
Living people
French film directors
French male screenwriters
French screenwriters
French male film actors
People from Juvisy-sur-Orge